The people of Roitegui (in Basque and officially Erretegi Roitegui / Erroitegi) belong to the municipality of Arraya-Maestu, in Álava (Spain). The extensive municipality of Arraya-Maestu belongs to the gang mountains of Alava. Formed by several valleys around Berrón (Arraya Valley) and Musitu (Valley Laminoria), streams, the municipality is surrounded by the mountains of Iturrieta and Vitoria.

Populated places in Álava